The 2018–19 SLC Twenty20 Tournament was a Twenty20 cricket tournament that was held in Sri Lanka. It was played between twenty-four domestic teams in Sri Lanka, with the tournament running from 15 to 27 February 2019. Nondescripts Cricket Club were the defending champions.

On the opening day of the tournament, Sinhalese Sports Club beat Saracens Sports Club in the Super Over, after the match ended as a tie, and Sadeera Samarawickrama scored an unbeaten century for Colts Cricket Club against Police Sports Club. On 19 February 2019, Dinesh Chandimal also scored a century in the tournament, a day after he was dropped from Sri Lanka's One Day International (ODI) squad for their series against South Africa.

Following the conclusion of the group stage fixtures, Chilaw Marians Cricket Club, Colombo Cricket Club, Galle Cricket Club, Moors Sports Club, Nondescripts Cricket Club, Ragama Cricket Club, Sri Lanka Army Sports Club and Tamil Union Cricket and Athletic Club had all progressed to the knockout phase of the tournament. From the quarterfinals, Colombo Cricket Club, Moors Sports Club, Nondescripts Cricket Club and Sri Lanka Army Sports Club all advanced to the semi-finals. Colombo Cricket Club won their quarterfinal fixture against Ragama Cricket Club in the Super Over, after the match was tied.

In the first semi-final, Moors Sports Club beat Sri Lanka Army Sports Club by six wickets, despite Ashan Randika scoring a century for Sri Lanka Army. The second semi-final saw Nondescripts Cricket Club beat Colombo Cricket Club by one run, with the match going to the final ball. Moors Sports Club won the tournament, after they beat Nondescripts Cricket Club by one wicket in the final.

Fixtures

Group stage

Group A

Group B

Group C

Group D

Knockout stage

Quarterfinals

Finals

References

External links
 Series home at ESPN Cricinfo

SLC Twenty20 Tournament
SLC Twenty20 Tournament